Elections to Rossendale Borough Council were held on 2 May 2002.  The whole council was up for election with boundary changes since the last election in 2000. The Labour party took overall control of the council from the Conservative party.

Election result

Ward results

References
2002 Rossendale election result
 Ward results

2002
2002 English local elections
2000s in Lancashire